Mark Epton (born 22 October 1965 in Mexborough, Doncaster) is a retired flyweight boxer from England.

Boxing career

Amateur career
Epton represented England and won a silver medal in the 48 kg light-flyweight division, at the 1986 Commonwealth Games in Edinburgh, Scotland.

He represented Great Britain and Northern Ireland at the 1988 Summer Olympics in Seoul, South Korea. In the round of 64 he defeated Damber Bhatta (Nepal) by decision, 5-0 and in the round of 32 lost to Ivalio Marinov (Bulgaria) by decision, 0-5.

Boxing for the Mexborough Athletic ABC he was a three times winner of the prestigious ABA light-flyweight championship (1985, 1986 and 1987).

Professional career
Nicknamed "The Choirboy" he made his professional debut on 24 May 1989. After six bouts as a pro, which he all won, Epton retired from boxing.

References

External links
 

1965 births
Living people
People from Mexborough
Sportspeople from Doncaster
English male boxers
Flyweight boxers
Commonwealth Games silver medallists for England
Boxers at the 1988 Summer Olympics
Olympic boxers of Great Britain
Boxers at the 1986 Commonwealth Games
Commonwealth Games medallists in boxing
Medallists at the 1986 Commonwealth Games